The Grey Car is a 1919 film directed by Enrique Rosas which is the number 98 in 100 Mexican best movies.

Synopsis 
Detective Cabrera wants to re-establish peace in Mexico City after a vandalism wave.

References

External links 

1919 films
Mexican silent films
Mexican black-and-white films
Films set in Mexico City
Mexico in fiction
1910s Spanish-language films
1919 crime drama films
Mexican crime drama films
Silent drama films